The 2022 W Series was the third season of the W Series motor racing championship. The championship was exclusively open to female racing drivers as a Formula Regional-level racing series in support of the 2022 Formula One World Championship.

Jamie Chadwick became a three time champion following the cancellation of the remainder of the season on 10 October 2022.

Entries 
The following drivers and teams competed in the 2022 W Series season. All teams used Hankook tyres, and ran two mechanically-identical Tatuus F3 T-318-Alfa Romeo cars with two drivers. The rounds at Barcelona and Singapore used Tatuus FT-60-Toyota cars loaned by Toyota Racing Series organiser Toyota Gazoo Racing New Zealand.

All cars were operated by Fine Moments, and 'teams' were purely for sponsorship and identification purposes.

Driver selection 
The top eight finishers from the 2021 championship, as well as the two W Series Academy drivers Nerea Martí and Irina Sidorkova, were guaranteed a place in the 2022 season. Sidorkova was later confirmed to not be competing as a result of the restrictions on the participation of Russian drivers following the 2022 Russian invasion of Ukraine.

From 31 January to 4 February, a five-day test with a Crawford F4-16 car for 15 prospective drivers was conducted at Inde Motorsports Ranch in Arizona, United States. The following drivers took part:

  Madison Aust
  Júlia Ayoub
  Tereza Bábíčková
  Lindsay Brewer
  Léna Bühler
  Bianca Bustamante
  Maite Cáceres
  Chloe Chambers
  Emely de Heus
  Jorden Dolischka
  Hannah Greenemeier
  Nicole Havrda
  Jem Hepworth
  Corinna Kamper
  Lola Lovinfosse

A second pre-season test took place at Barcelona on 2–4 March, with the nine automatic qualifiers from 2021 joined by 12 potential drivers — of which five had previous W Series experience and six were present at the Arizona test; Juju Noda, the only driver to receive a free pass:

  Tereza Bábíčková
  Léna Bühler
  Bianca Bustamante
  Chloe Chambers
  Emely de Heus
  Belén García
  Marta García
  Megan Gilkes
  Jessica Hawkins
  Jem Hepworth
  Juju Noda
  Bruna Tomaselli

The full driver line-up was revealed on 22 March 2022. On 22 April 2022, Abbie Eaton was confirmed as the final driver, with Ayla Ågren announced as reserve driver.

Mid-season changes
Tereza Bábíčková did not take part in the seventh race of the 2022 season in Singapore due to injury. Bábíčková sustained a spinal injury during an incident in the first race of the Formula Regional European Championship by Alpine (FRECA) held at the Red Bull Ring in early September.

Championship changes 
Though there were initial plans to introduce FIA-registered standings for formal teams for the season, the championship remained fully centrally-run for a third consecutive year, with 'teams' continuing to be purely for sponsorship and identification purposes. The first of these teams to be announced was Jenner Racing, owned by media personality, Olympic champion and former racing driver Caitlyn Jenner. Three further entries joined the championship: Click2Drive Bristol Street Motors Racing and the cryptocurrency-backed Quantfury and CortDAO teams.

Calendar and results 
The provisional calendar was announced on 27 January 2022. W Series continued its partnership with Formula One, so all ten events were part of Grand Prix weekends. An updated calendar was announced on 30 March 2022, with the first and last rounds at Miami and Mexico City confirmed to be double-headers. On 27 July 2022, it was announced that the Marina Bay Street Circuit would replace the Suzuka Circuit due to operational challenges. On 10 October 2022 it was announced the final rounds in United States and Mexico had been cancelled for monetary reasons. This crowned points leader Jamie Chadwick series champion for a third time, as the number of races held exceeded the minimum of six required under the series' rules for a championship to be decided.

Season summary
The third season of the championship started with its debut event around the Miami International Autodrome. Nerea Martí scored her maiden pole position, but stalled at the start. This allowed Jamie Chadwick and Emma Kimiläinen through, wo started battling for the lead until Alice Powell hit the wall, causing a lengthy safety car and eventually a stoppage. Chadwick led the restart and remained ahead of Kimiläinen. The top pair gapped the field while battling, before a late-race safety car was called for a collision between Fabienne Wohlwend and Abbie Eaton. In a single lap shootout to the chequered flag, Marta García attempted a move on Kimiläinen for second but made contact with the Finn and spun her. Chadwick won the race ahead of García, but a time penalty for the CortDAO driver promoted Jessica Hawkins to second and Beitske Visser to third.

Chadwick had pole for the second Miami race, and kept her lead ahead of Martí and Kimiläinen. The latter pair battled for the first part of the race, with Martí eventually coming out in front. By then however, Chadwick had a comfortable gap on them, which she kept until the end. Behind the pair, Kimiläinen struggled to keep Powell and Belén García behind. On the penultimate lap Kimiläinen half-spun and Powell collided with her; the Brit sustaining front wing damage but held on to finish third. A penalty demoted Martí behind Powell for an illegal defensive move.

The Circuit de Barcelona-Catalunya played host to the third round of the season, with Chadwick taking pole. Behind her, Abbi Pulling disposed of her mentor Powell at the start to move into second place and began closing up to the leader. The gaps between the top trio remained steady all through the race, and Chadwick was able to manage her tyres the best of the three. No one could muster a serious attack on her lead, even though Pulling came close to it at various points during the race and was within half a second of Chadwick on the last lap. A third win cemented Chadwick's championship advantage, now at 37 points, and Pulling's second place moved her up to second in the standings. Chloe Chambers spun into the gravel on the last lap.

Chadwick continued where she left off at Silverstone, taking her third pole position in a row. Powell, who qualified third, stalled on the formation lap and failed to re-take her grid position fast enough on the formation lap, netting her a stop-go penalty. This promoted Kimiläinen to second, four seconds behind Chadwick at that point. Pulling rose up from fifth to third and collided with Kimiläinen when trying to overtake her on the penultimate lap. The pair just managed to stay second and third ahead of Wohlwend, having both sustained damage. As a result of the incident, Chadwick won the race by almost twenty seconds, bolstering her championship lead to 47 points.

The next round at Paul Ricard initially saw Chadwick on pole again, before a grid penalty promoted Visser to first. A safety car was called after a tumultuous start in the mid-pack saw Eaton's car launched up in the air and ending her race, but not before Chadwick rounded up both Visser and second-placed Martí within the first three corners. Chadwick's lead was only threatened once during the race when Visser briefly re-passed her on the safety car restart, but Chadwick assumed authority not long after with Visser dropping back to fourth behind Belén García and Martí. Another safety car was later called for a collision between Chambers and Emely de Heus. In the last half of the race, the CortDAO team-mates fought a titanic battle over seventh which was ultimately resolved in favour of Marta García. Chadwick won again and her championship lead now stood at 70 points.

When the series visited the Hungaroring, Chadwick could only manage fifth in qualifying as Powell took pole. The race began in damp conditions and Martí was caught out, dropping back from third and allowing Chadwick through before making contact with team-mate Belén García. Chadwick then moved up into third by passing Marta García. Further behind, Kimiläinen tagged Hawkins into a spin – the Puma driver later retiring from the race due to the damage incurred. Chadwick continued to improve her position, passing Visser for second shortly before the safety car was called for Bianca Bustamante – who had spun, damaged her car and stopped in the pit lane entry. After a four-minute dash to the end, Powell held on to end Chadwick's win streak and move into second in the standings; Chadwick maintaining a 75-point lead.

Originally planned to be held at Suzuka, the next round was moved to the Marina Bay Street Circuit in Singapore. Ahead of the event, Tereza Bábíčková broke her back in a Formula Regional European Championship race and was replaced with Ayla Ågren. Marta García took pole in a qualifying session disrupted by torrential tropical storms, but Chadwick could only manage eighth on the grid. Visser took the lead at the start from Marta García, who struggled to hold on to the Dutchwoman's pace. García was soon overtaken by Powell, who then set after Visser. Chadwick meanwhile was stuck behind Hawkins having made her way to sixth, and after multiple laps she attempted an overtake but outbraked herself and crashed at turn seven. One lap remained after the safety car, with Visser holding on to win her first race since Zolder 2019.

Doubts arose over the financial health of the championship in the days leading up to the Singapore event. The series organisers set a deadline to determine whether to hold the last three races for the week after the Singapore round. The final races of the season were ultimately cancelled for monetary reasons on 10 October 2022. The series CEO, Catherine Bond Muir, stated that there was "great optimism" when looking at being able to hold the 2023 season and the longer-term future of the series. Jamie Chadwick was crowned champion, defending her title once again and remaining the only W Series champion to date.

Championship standings

Scoring system 
Points were awarded to the top ten classified finishers as follows:

Drivers' Championship

Notes

References

External links 
 

W Series
W Series
W Series
W Series (championship)